"Better" is a song recorded by South Korean girl group Twice. It is the group's seventh Japanese maxi single, featuring three other tracks. It was pre-released for digital download and streaming on November 11, 2020, by Warner Music Japan. The single was physically released on November 18, 2020, in Japan.

Background and release
Twice released their third Japanese compilation album, #Twice3 in September 2020, which reached number one the Oricon Albums Chart and set the record for the highest number of sales by a female foreign artist in Japan. On September 23, 2020, the group announced the release of their seventh Japanese single titled "Better", along with several teaser images for the new track. It marks the group's first Japanese single since "Fanfare" (2020). The song was composed by Eunsol and Lauren Kaori, with lyrics written by the latter and Mio Jorakuji.

"Better" was released for digital download and streaming in various countries on November 11, 2020, by Warner Music Japan. The single includes the B-side track "Scorpion", and instrumentals of both "Better" and "Scorpion". The accompanying music video was released simultaneously with the single's release. The song was made available as a CD single in Japan on November 18, 2020, in four versions: Regular Edition, First Press Limited Edition A and First Press Limited Edition B, and Fan Club Edition (Once Japan Limited Edition). The Regular Edition contains the CD with a trading card. The First Press Limited Edition A contains the CD single, a lyric-book of the members, a trading card, and a DVD containing the making of the music video of "Better" and the making of album jacket photos. The First Press Limited Edition B contains the CD, a trading card, a jacket design, and an original photo sticker sheet. The Once Japan version contains the CD, two trading cards, and a 3X3 fold poster.

Promotion
Twice performed "Better" for the first time on TV Asahi's Music Station on November 13, 2020. The group performed the song on a special showcase, on November 18, to commemorate the single's release, which was broadcast live through YouTube. A dance-practice video was also released the same day, featuring the group practicing their choreography.

Commercial performance
The CD single debuted at number two on the daily ranking of Oricon Singles Chart with 54,152 units sold on its release day. It also ranked number two on the weekly Oricon Singles Chart with 83,764 copies sold. It also debuted at number three on the Billboard Japan Hot 100 chart, recording 93,548 unit sales on November 16–22, 2020.

Track listing

Credits and personnel
Credits adapted from CD single liner notes.

 Twice – lead vocals, background vocals
 Lauren Kaori – lyricist, composer (on "Better")
 Mio Jorakuji – lyricist (on "Better")
 Eunsol – composer, arranger, all instruments (on "Better")
 Kate – background vocals
 Armadillo – vocal director (on "Better")
 Park Eunjung – recording engineer
 Tony Maserati – mixer (on "Better")
 Chris Gehringer – mastering engineer (on "Better")
 Kiee – lyricist (on "Scorpion")
 Woo Min Lee "collapsedone" – composer, arranger, all instruments (on "Scorpion")
 Krysta Youngs – composer (on "Scorpion")
 Julia Ross – composer (on "Scorpion")
 Emily Yeonseo Kim – vocal director (on "Scorpion")
 Shin Bongwon – mixer (on "Scorpion")
 Park Jung Un – mastering engineer (on "Scorpion")

Charts

Certifications

Release history

References

2020 singles
2020 songs
Japanese-language songs
Twice (group) songs